Marie-Catherine Girod (born 19 August 1949) is a French classical pianist.

Biography 
Born in Peyrehorade, Girod studied piano at the Conservatoire de musique de Bordeaux, then at the Conservatoire de Paris where she entered Jules Gentil's class. She then worked with Paul Badura-Skoda and György Sebők. She performs in recital in Europe and the United States (Richmond Festival in Virginia), in chamber formation and as soloist with various orchestras, including the orchestra of Brittany with which she recorded Paul Le Flem's Fantaisie pour piano et orchestre. She frequently participates in concerts organized by Radio France, and in radio broadcasts.

An artist with a passionate temperament, an open and curious mind, she is as well at ease in the great classical and romantic repertoire (Carl Maria von Weber, Frédéric Chopin, Felix Mendelssohn,) than with Maurice Ravel, Claude Debussy and Henri Dutilleux that she likes to interpret. She can also be found in a much rarer repertoire, largely contributing to the rediscovery of composers who are rarely played. Among others, hier recordings of works by Gabriel Dupont, Maurice Emmanuel, André Jolivet, Arthur Lourié and Gustave Samazeuilh are unanimously acclaimed by critics, and have won her numerous awards. Through her personal choices, her total commitment to bringing music to life, Girod brings to light, through records and concerts, unjustly neglected composers.

In addition to her technical mastery, her playing shows great expressiveness, alternately brilliant and intimate, clear, colourful and delicate, using a vast palette of nuances that always seduces the audience. In 2009 she completed a recording cycle of the complete piano work by Felix Mendelssohn.

A pedagogue, she directed the Conservatory of Sucy-en-Brie (94) from 1986 to 2012, she created in 1992 the Concours national de piano of Sucy that she organized until 2005, and has been teaching since October 2011 at the École Normale de Musique de Paris.

Prizes 
 Grand prix de l’Académie nationale du disque français (piano sonatas: Auric, Dutilleux, Jolivet's 1st piano sonata)
 Grand prix de l’Académie nationale du disque français (Sonatines by Maurice Emmanuel)
 Lauréate du Grand prix International Charles Cros (1991) (Arthur Lourié's works for piano)

Distinctions 
1991: Chevalier of the Arts et Lettres
2011: Officier  of the National Order of Merit

Selected recordings 
Among many recordings, worth mentioning are:
 Felix Mendelssohn: Complete work for piano (8 CDs), Éditions Saphir
 Sergueï Rachmaninov: 2nd sonata Op.36, 6 moments musicaux Op.16, Éditions Solstice
 Carl Maria von Weber: the four sonatas for piano, Éditions Solstice
 York Bowen: 24 Preludes, Nocturnes, Op.78, Rêveries Op.86, Éditions 3DClassics
 Louis Aubert / Abel Decaux and others: Sillages / Clairs de lune / Tombeau de Claude Debussy, Éditions 3DClassics
 Gabriel Dupont / Gustave Samazeuilh:  / Le chant de la mer, Éditions 3DClassics
 Pierre-Octave Ferroud: Complete piano music (world premiere recording) Éditions 3DClassics
 Paul Le Flem:

 Fantaisie pour piano et orchestre (+ , Symphonie n°1), Orchestre National de Bretagne, dir. Claude Schnitzler, Éditions Timpani
 Works for piano, works for piano and violin, Annick Roussin, violin, Éditions Accord

References

External links 
 Personal website
 Marie-Catherine Girod on Pianobleu.com
 Marie-Catherine Girod, virtuose des Gaves
  Marie-Catherine Girod on France Musique
 Marie-Catherine Girod on Société Chopin à Paris
 Marie-Catherine Girod, piano | Sonate pour piano, Henri Dutilleux (YouTube)

20th-century French women classical pianists
21st-century French women classical pianists
Academic staff of the École Normale de Musique de Paris
Chevaliers of the Ordre des Arts et des Lettres
Knights of the Ordre national du Mérite
People from Landes (department)
1949 births
Living people
Women music educators